Ricky Russert (born July 22, 1983) is an American actor and producer known for his roles as Tommy Littlestone on the Cinemax original series Banshee  and Shane Stant in the 2017 biopic I, Tonya.

Career
On television, Russert has played Chris in The Walking Dead, Frank in Mr. Mercedes and Lt. Samuel Diaz in the CBS reboot of MacGyver. In 2016, Russert wrote, produced and starred in the short film, Sllip.

Film

Television

References

External links
 
 
 

1983 births
21st-century American male actors
American male film actors
American male television actors
Living people